was a Japanese prelate of the Catholic Church who served as Archbishop of Tokyo from 2000 to 2017.

Okada was born in Ichikawa in Chiba Prefecture. He graduated from the University of Tokyo with the LL.B. He was ordained a priest on 3 November 1973. On 15 April 1991, he was appointed bishop of Urawa by Pope John Paul II. He received his episcopal consecration on 16 September from Seiichi Shirayanagi, with Archbishops Paul Hisao Yasuda and Francis Xavier Kaname Shimamoto serving as co-consecrators.

Following the early resignation of Cardinal Shirayanagi, Pope John Paul II appointed him Archbishop of Tokyo on June 12, 2000. His installation took place on the following 3 September. He was president of the Japanese bishops' conference.

On October 27, 2012, Pope Benedict XVI named Okada a member of the Pontifical Council for Interreligious Dialogue.

In January 2011, the Holy See countermanded the decision of Japan's bishops to suspend the activities of a controversial lay movement, the Neocatechumenal Way, for five years.

On July 27, 2013, Pope Francis named him Apostolic Administrator of the Diocese of Saitama.

Pope Francis accepted his resignation on October 25, 2017, and appointed Bishop Tarcisio Isao Kikuchi, S.V.D. of the Niigata diocese to succeed him.

Okada died on 18 December 2020 in Tokyo.  He was 79 years old.

References

1941 births
2020 deaths
People from Ichikawa, Chiba
21st-century Roman Catholic archbishops in Japan
20th-century Roman Catholic bishops in Japan
University of Tokyo alumni
Deaths from esophageal cancer
Deaths from cancer in Japan
Japanese Roman Catholic archbishops